Warp, warped or warping may refer to:

Arts and entertainment

Books and comics
 WaRP Graphics, an alternative comics publisher
 Warp (First Comics), comic book series published by First Comics based on the play Warp!
 Warp (comics), a DC Comics supervillain
 Warp (magazine), formerly the magazine and official organ of the New Zealand National Association for Science

Music
 Warp (record label), an independent UK record label
 Warp Films, a side project of Warp Records
 Warp 10: Influences, Classics, Remixes, a series of compilation albums issued by Warp Records in 1999

Albums
 Warp (album), 1982 album by New Musik
 Warp, 2001 album by the Japanese band Judy and Mary
 W.A.R.P.E.D., a 2005 album by Savatage guitarist Chris Caffery

Songs
 "Warp", 2009 single by The Bloody Beetroots
 "Warped" (song), a song by the Red Hot Chili Peppers from their 1995 album One Hot Minute
 "Warped", a song by Blackfoot from the 1980 album Tomcattin'
 "Warping", a song by Death Grips from the album Bottomless Pit

Video games
 Warp (video games), an element in video games that allows a character to travel instantly between two locations
 Warp (company), now known as From Yellow to Orange, a Japanese video game developer
 Warp (1985 video game), an interactive fiction game developed for the HP3000 platform
 Warp (2012 video game), a download only game for consoles where you warp an alien through labs
 Warp (Warhammer 40000), home of the Chaos powers in the Warhammer 40000 series
 Crash Bandicoot 3: Warped, a platform game developed by Naughty Dog for the PlayStation

Other arts and entertainment
Warp Darkmatter, a character in animated TV series and the pilot episode Buzz Lightyear of Star Command: The Adventure Begins and Buzz Lightyear of Star Command
 Warp!, a 1970s Broadway play
 Warped!, a television series.
 Warp drive, a fictional faster-than-light propulsion system in science fiction
 WARP-CD, a low-power TV station in Tampa-St. Petersburg, Florida, US
 Warped Tour, an annual touring music and extreme sports festival

Science and technology
 Alcubierre drive, a hypothetical means of propulsion also called a "warp drive"
 Bow and warp of semiconductor wafers and substrates, a warp parameter of the semiconductor wafer
 WIMP Argon Programme (WArP), a cold dark matter search experiment
 Warped geometry, a type of Lorentzian manifold satisfying certain specific properties

Computing
 OS/2 Warp, a name for version 3.0 of the IBM operating system
 WARP (systolic array), a series of systolic array machines
 Windows Advanced Rasterization Platform, a Direct3D software rasterizer included in Microsoft Windows 7 and higher
 WARP (information security) (Warning, advice and reporting point), a community or internal company-based 
 WARP, a VPN service developed by Cloudflare
 Image warping, the process of distorting an image digitally
 Softwarp, a software technique to warp an image so that it can be projected on a curved screen
 Warped linear predictive coding, a tool used in audio signal processing
 Warp (CUDA), data parallelism per instruction proposed by CUDA

Transportation

Aviation
 Star-Lite Warp 1-A, an American ultralight aircraft design
 Wing warping, a manner of controlling the roll of an aeroplane
 Warp Drive Inc, a US propeller manufacturer

Ships
 Warping (sailing), a slow method of moving a boat in still waters or against the wind
 Anchor Warp, a line (particularly a rope) attached to an anchor

Other uses
 Warping in agriculture, the practice of flooding agricultural land with turbid river water to add sediment to the soil
 Weak Axiom of Revealed Preferences, an axiom in the economic theory of revealed preference
 Wood warping, a deviation from flatness due to uneven drying of wood
 Warp (weaving), the set of lengthwise threads attached to a loom
 Warp knitting, a major style of knitting
 Warp Drive, a street in Dulles, Virginia, US
 Warp drive, a fictitious spacecraft propulsion system in many science fiction works, most notably used in Star Trek.
 Wins Above Replacement Player, a statistical means of evaluating player production in various team sports

See also 

 
 
 Warpe (disambiguation)
 Warp zone (disambiguation)
 Warp and weft (disambiguation)